Cambridge is a suburb in the greater area of Hobart, capital of Tasmania, Australia. It is in the City of Clarence local government area. The suburb is situated in close proximity with Hobart International Airport and the Cambridge Aerodrome (Cambridge Airport), and is approximately 18 km to Hobart via the Tasman Highway. In recent years Cambridge had developed an Industrial estate and has become a popular commuter town for people working in Hobart.

Population
In the 2016 Census, there were 1,161 people in Cambridge. 87.6% of people were born in Australia and 95.1% of people spoke only English at home. The most common responses for religion were No Religion 36.1%, Anglican 23.7% and Catholic 23.5%.

Retail/facilities of Cambridge
 BP Service station
Cambridge Primary school
The Cambridge Centre Shopping Centre

References

External links

Localities of City of Clarence